Tim Elia Staubli (born 16 April 2000) is a Swiss professional footballer who plays as a midfielder for Wil.

Professional career
On 24 May 2019, Staubli signed his first professional contract with St. Gallen. Staubli made his professional debut for St. Gallen in a 4–1 Swiss Super League win over Thun on 8 December 2019.

On 22 January 2022, Staubli joined Vaduz on loan until the end of the season, with an option to buy.

On 27 May 2022, Staubli signed a two-year contract with Wil.

References

External links

FCSG Profile
SFL Profile

Living people
2000 births
Sportspeople from the canton of St. Gallen
Association football midfielders
Swiss men's footballers
Switzerland youth international footballers
FC St. Gallen players
FC Vaduz players
FC Wil players
Swiss 1. Liga (football) players
Swiss Super League players
Swiss Challenge League players
Swiss expatriate footballers
Expatriate footballers in Liechtenstein
Swiss expatriate sportspeople in Liechtenstein